Gradsko is a village (despite the word grad meaning "town") located in the central part of North Macedonia. It is the seat of the Gradsko municipality. It is located very close to the main motorway which links Gevgelija on North Macedonia's border with Greece.

History
It was the ancient Paeonian capital of Stobi.

Demographics
On the 1927 ethnic map of Leonhard Schulze-Jena, the village is shown as a Christian Bulgarian village. According to the 2002 census, the village had a total of 2,219 inhabitants. Ethnic groups in the village include:

Macedonians 1,920
Turks 7
Serbs 14
Romani 48
Albanians 6
Bosniaks 215
Others 9

Transport
The settlement is served by the Gradsko railway station, with connections from Niš in Serbia to the port of Thessaloniki in Greece on the Aegean Sea (Corridor X), with Intercity services to Skopje and Thessaloniki in Greece.

References

Villages in Gradsko Municipality